The Schmücke is a ridge of hills in Thuringia, Germany.

Geography 
Together with the Hohe Schrecke, the Finne and the Hainleite, the Schmücke borders the northern rim of the Thuringian Basin. It lies between Hauteroda, Oberheldrungen, Heldrungen, Heldrungen station, Gorsleben and Hemleben. It is separated from the Hainleite in the west by the Sachsenburg Gate (Sachsenburger Pforte).

Hills 
Stubenberg 198 m AMSL
Scharfer Berg 249 m AMSL

Hills of Thuringia
Forests and woodlands of Thuringia